HD 143009 is a single star in the southern constellation of Lupus. It has an orange hue and is visible to the naked eye with an apparent visual magnitude of 4.99. The star lies at a distance of approximately 380 light years from the Sun based on parallax, but is drifting closer with a radial velocity of −27 km/s. It has an absolute magnitude of −0.64.

This is an evolved K-type star with a stellar classification of K0 II-III, displaying a luminosity class with mixed traits of a bright giant (II) and a giant star (III). With the supply of hydrogen at its core exhausted, the star has expanded to 16.8 times the radius of the Sun. It is radiating 152 times the Sun's luminosity from its enlarged photosphere at an effective temperature of 4,942 K.

References

K-type bright giants
Lupus (constellation)
Durchmusterung objects
143009
078323
5943